List of chancellors of Burgundy, as found in the Trophées tant sacrées que profanes de la Duché de Brabant.
The chancellor was one of the most powerful leaders of Burgundy.

References

Chancellors
Burgundy, Chancellors